Nicolaos Andreas Nicandrou was the chief executive officer of Prudential Corporation Asia, a subsidiary of Prudential plc.  He was formally the chief financial officer of Prudential plc in the United Kingdom.

References

Living people
British businesspeople
Chief financial officers
Cypriot accountants
Greek Cypriot people
Prudential plc people
Year of birth missing (living people)
Cypriot chief executives